Tyrosine-protein kinase SYK, also known as spleen tyrosine kinase, is an enzyme which in humans is encoded by the SYK gene.

Function 

SYK, along with ZAP70, is a member of the Syk family of tyrosine kinases. These cytoplasmic non-receptor tyrosine kinases share a characteristic dual SH2 domain separated by a linker domain. However, activation of SYK relies less on phosphorylation by Src family kinases than ZAP70. SYK and ZAP70 share a common evolutionary origin and split from a common ancestor in the jawed vertebrates.

While Syk and ZAP70 are primarily expressed in hematopoietic tissues, a variety of tissues express Syk. Within B  and T cells, respectively, Syk and ZAP70 transmit signals from the B-cell receptor and T-cell receptor. Syk plays a similar role in transmitting signals from a variety of cell surface receptors including CD74, Fc receptor, and integrins.

Function during development 
Mice that lack Syk completely (Syk−/−, Syk-knockout) die during embryonic development around midgestation. They show severe defects in the development of the lymphatic system. Normally, the lymphatic system and the blood system are strictly separated from each other. However, in Syk deficient mice the lymphatics and the blood vessels form abnormal shunts, leading to leakage of blood into the lymphatic system. The reason for this phenotype was identified by a genetic fate mapping approach, showing that Syk is expressed in myeloid cells which orchestrate the proper separation of lymphatics and blood system during embryogenesis and beyond. Thus, Syk is an essential regulator of the lymphatic system development in mice.

Clinical significance 

Abnormal function of Syk has been implicated in several instances of hematopoietic malignancies including translocations involving Itk and Tel.  Constitutive Syk activity can transform B cells. Several transforming viruses contain "Immunoreceptor Tyrosine Activation Motifs" (ITAMs) which lead to activation of Syk including Epstein–Barr virus, bovine leukemia virus, and mouse mammary tumor virus.

SYK inhibition
Given the central role of SYK in transmission of activating signals within B-cells, a suppression of this tyrosine kinase might aid in the treatment of B cell malignancies and autoimmune diseases.

Syk inhibition has been proposed as a therapy for both lymphoma and chronic lymphocytic leukemia. Syk inhibitors are in clinical development, including cerdulatinib and entospletinib. Other inhibitors of B-cell receptor (BCR) signaling including ibrutinib (PCI-32765) which inhibits BTK, and idelalisib (PI3K inhibitor - CAL-101 / GS-1101) showed activity in the diseases as well.

The orally active SYK inhibitor fostamatinib (R788) in the treatment of immune thrombocytopenia.

The Syk inhibitor nilvadipine has been shown to regulate amyloid-β production and Tau phosphorylation and hence has been proposed as a treatment for Alzheimer's disease and has entered phase III clinical trials.

Epithelial malignancies
The role of Syk in epithelial malignancies is controversial.  Several authors have suggested that abnormal Syk function facilitates transformation in Nasopharyngeal carcinoma and head and neck cancer while other authors have suggested a tumor suppressor role in breast and gastric cancer.

Without Syk, the protein it makes, and genetic disruption in a panel of 55 genes thought also to be controlled by Syk, breast ductal carcinoma in situ (breast DCIS, which can become invasive), it is believed that the cancer has a markedly increased tendency to invade and metastasize.

Interactions 

Syk has been shown to interact with:

 Cbl gene
 CRKL,
 FCGR2A,
 FYN,
 Grb2,
 Lck,
 LYN,
 PTK2,
 PTPN6, and
 VAV1.

References

Further reading

External links 
 
 

Tyrosine kinases